Gaura  is a village in Kapurthala district of Punjab State, India. The village is administrated by a Sarpanch, who is an elected representative.

Demography 
According to the report published by Census India in 2011, Gaura has a total number of 105 houses and population of 475 of which include 239 males and 236 females. Literacy rate of Gaura is 64.29%, lower than state average of 75.84%.  The population of children under the age of 6 years is 55 which is  11.58% of total population of Gaura, and child sex ratio is approximately  897, higher than state average of 846.

Population data

Air travel connectivity 
The closest airport to the village is Sri Guru Ram Dass Jee International Airport.

Villages in Kapurthala

External links
  Villages in Kapurthala
 Kapurthala Villages List

References

Villages in Kapurthala district